Ansgarde of Burgundy (d. 880/882) was a French queen of Aquitaine, but never of West Francia, the daughter of Hardouin of Burgundy. She secretly married Louis the Stammerer before he was king; her sons became Louis III of France and Carloman II.

Because Charles the Bald wished to marry his son to Adelaide of Paris, he had to seek a papal annulment; this he did and Adelaide married Louis in February 875.

Ansgarde was thus repudiated, but at the death of Louis in 879 she worked to ensure that her sons could mount the throne of France themselves.  To that end, she sought to revisit the subject of her divorce with the archbishop of Reims.  Adelaide, however, was pregnant, and gave birth to a son on September 17 of that year, which thus called into doubt the inheritance of Ansgarde's own sons.

Ansgarde and her sons attacked Adelaide's marriage, accusing her of adultery; consequently, Louis and Carloman mounted the throne together. However, both died without issue, and after a long and difficult process Adelaide finally saw her son confirmed as Charles III, the only legitimate heir to the throne.

Ansgarde passes into obscurity after this episode, and the date of her death is not conclusively known.

References
  Martina Hartmann: Die Königin im frühen Mittelalter. Kohlhammer, Stuttgart 2009, ISBN 978-3-17-0184-73-2

880s deaths
Year of birth unknown
Year of death uncertain
Women from Burgundy
Aquitainian queens consort
9th-century French women
9th-century French people